Naganao (written: 長直) is a masculine Japanese given name. Notable people with the name include:

 (1610–1672), Japanese daimyō
 (1672–1722), Japanese daimyō

Japanese masculine given names